Martínez (often spelled without the acute accent on the "I") is a common surname in the Spanish language. Martínez is the most common surname in the Spanish regions of Navarre, La Rioja, Cuenca and Murcia. There are also variations such as San Martin and Martín (with an accent on the "i").

It originated as a patronymic surname, meaning "son of Martín" (English: Martin).

Among Mozarabs,  the name was Arabized to "Mardanish" (e.g. Ibn Mardanish) (as well as other patronymics such as Hernandez and Gomez). 

It is also used sometimes as a component word of a multi-word surname such as Martínez del Río.  Martínez comes from the personal name "Martin", itself derived from the Latin Martinus, whose root is Mars, the name of the Roman god of fertility and war. The name Martin became popular throughout Christian Europe after it was borne by a famous 4th-century saint who was active in Roman Gaul (now France), Martin of Tours.

Martínez is a widely spread surname (among other European surnames) due in large part to the global influence of the Spanish culture on territories and colonies in the Americas, Africa and Asia. Likewise, due to emigration throughout Europe, Martínez is relatively common in countries neighboring or near Spain, such as: Andorra, Portugal, France, Switzerland and Italy.

In the United States, according to the 1990 Census, "Martinez" ranked nineteenth among all surnames reported, accounting for 0.23% of the population. In France according to a 1990 census, "Martinez" ranked sixteenth among all surnames reported.

The Portuguese equivalent of Martínez is Martins meaning "son of Martin".  The Italian equivalents are: Martinelli, Martinolli, Martini, Martino, DiMartini, DiMartino, and Martinisi. The Romanian equivalent is Martinescu.

Geographical distribution
As of 2014, 38.8% of all known bearers of the surname Martínez were residents of Mexico (frequency 1:37), 9.9% of Spain (1:54), 9.2% of the United States (1:449), 7.9% of Colombia (1:69), 4.5% of Venezuela (1:77), 4.4% of Argentina (1:112), 2.7% of Cuba (1:49), 2.7% of Honduras (1:38), 2.4% of Guatemala (1:77), 2.2% of El Salvador (1:33), 2.0% of the Dominican Republic (1:61), 1.9% of Paraguay (1:43), 1.7% of Nicaragua (1:40), 1.6% of the Philippines (1:706), 1.4% of Chile (1:142) and 1.3% of Peru (1:275).

In Spain, the frequency of the surname was higher than national average (1:54) in the following autonomous communities:
 1. Region of Murcia (1:18)
 2. La Rioja (1:26)
 3. Valencian Community (1:35)
 4. Castilla-La Mancha (1:39)
 5. Asturias (1:45)
 6. Galicia (1:50)
 7. Cantabria (1:54)

In El Salvador, the frequency of the surname was higher than national average (1:33) in the following departments:
 1. Santa Ana (1:26)
 2. Morazán (1:26)
 3. La Paz (1:27)
 4. Ahuachapán (1:29)
 5. San Salvador (1:32)
 6. San Vicente (1:33)

Arts
Acting and comedy

 A Martinez, American actor
 Albert Martinez, Filipino actor
 Benito Martinez, American actor
 Carlos Martínez, Spanish mime actor
 Francesca Martinez, English comedian and actor
 Kris Martinez, American comedian and entertainer also known as Kristory
 Mariano Martínez (born 1978), Argentine actor and model
 Micaela Martinez DuCasse (1913–1989), American artist, author, and educator
 Natalia Martínez Streignard (born 1970) Venezuelan actress
 Natalie Martinez, American model and actress
 Olivier Martinez, French actor
 Ray Martínez, Cuban-American musician
 Shelly Martinez (born 1980), Mexican American model, actress. Also known as wrestler and valet.
 Ursula Martinez, Anglo-Spanish, English-based writer and cabaret performer
 Patrice Martinez, American actress
 Yoya Martinez, Chilean actress  

Crafts

 Maria Ramita Martinez, Picuris Pueblo potter

Design and fashion

 Francesca Martinez, Italian top model
 Raúl Martínez, Cuban designer, photographer, muralist, and graphic artist. 
 Silvia Martínez, Venezuelan pageant titleholder
 Soraida Martinez, American artist/designer, creator of "Verdadism" art

Journalism

 Albertina Martínez Burgos (1981-2019), Chilean photojournalist
 Andrés Martínez, American newspaper editor of the Los Angeles Times
 Eduardo Martínez Celis, Mexican journalist
 Mónica Martínez (born 1975), Spanish journalist, model and television presenter
 Regina Martínez Pérez, Mexican journalist for Proceso
 Walter Martinez, Venezuelan journalist

Literature

 Alfonso Martínez de Toledo, medieval Spanish poet
 Claudia Guadalupe Martinez, American children's author
 Guillermo Martínez, Argentine novelist

 J. Michael Martinez, American poet
 Tomás Eloy Martínez, Argentine novelist and journalist

Music

 Ana María Martínez, Puerto Rican opera singer
 Angie Martinez, hiphop artist and radio/television personality
 Benito Martínez, Puerto Rican singer known professionally as Bad Bunny
 Cliff Martinez, American film-score composer and former drummer
 Cruz Martínez, American musician and record producer
 Henry Martínez, Venezuelan songwriter
 Linda Martinez (1975–2005), American musician
 Melanie Martinez, American singer, songwriter and music video director
 S. A. Martinez, vocalist for the rock band "311"
 Sabu Martinez, American conguero and percussionist

Painting and sculpture

 Ana Maria de Martinez, Salvadoran artist
 Isabel Martinez (artist), Mexican-American artist
 Marion C. Martinez (born 1954), Mexican-American artist
 Raúl Martínez, Cuban painter, designer, photographer, muralist and graphic artist
 Santiago Martínez Delgado, Colombian painter and sculptor
 Soraida Martinez, Artist, Creator of Verdadism  
 Xavier Martínez, Mexican American painter artist

Business

 Mariano Martinez (entrepreneur) (born 1944), Mexican American inventor, entrepreneur and restaurateur
 Vicente Martinez Ybor, Spanish-American cigar industrialist (entrepreneur) in Tampa, Florida

Military

 Arsenio Martínez-Campos, Spanish officer
 Esteban José Martínez Fernández y Martínez de la Sierra, 18th-century Spanish naval commander
 Gustavo Álvarez Martínez, Honduran military officer
 Jerry P. Martinez, U.S. Air Force lieutenant general
 Joe P. Martinez, U.S. Army soldier during World War II
 Juan Martínez de Ampiés, Spanish soldier, founder of Santa Ana de Coro (Venezuela)

Politics and law

 Alicia Austria-Martinez, Associate Justice of the Supreme Court of the Philippines
 Andrés Martínez Trueba, President of Uruguay from 1951 to 1955
 Augusto Martínez Sánchez, Cuban politician
 Bernard Martínez Valerio, Honduran politician
 Bob Martinez, Spanish-American former Governor of the State of Florida (born in Tampa, Florida)
 Carmen Dorantes Martínez, Mexican politician 
 Cruz Martínez Esteruelas, Spanish politician
 Daniel Martínez (politician), Uruguayan politician and engineer
 Delfina Martínez, Uruguayan activist
 Eduardo Martínez Celis, Mexican politician and journalist
 Elvin L. Martinez, U.S. politician, Florida House of Representatives
 Felix Martínez de Torrelaguna, acting Governor of New Mexico
 Henriette Martinez (1949), French politician
 Jean-Claude Martinez (1945), French politician
 Jennifer Martínez, human rights lawyer
 José Martínez Berasáin, Spanish Carlist politician
 Louis Alphonse, Duke of Anjou, Prince Louis Alphonse of Bourbon y Martinez-Bordiú, Louis XX, King of France and Navarre
 Marco Antonio Martinez Dabdoub, mayor of Nogales, Sonora, Mexico
 Martín C. Martínez, Uruguayan politician
 Matthew G. Martínez, former U.S. Representative from California
 Maximiliano Hernández Martínez, former president of El Salvador
 Mel Martinez, U.S. Senator from Florida
 Michael N. Martinez, Utah lawyer
 Miguel Martínez de Pinillos Sáenz, Spanish Carlist politician and entrepreneur
 Mike Martinez, American politician from Texas
 Nury Martinez, American politician, former President of the Los Angeles City Council
 Philip Ray Martinez (1953-2021), American judge
 Raúl L. Martínez, Cuban politician, former mayor of Hialeah, Florida, United States
 Susana Martínez, first female Governor of New Mexico
 Sylvia Martínez Elizondo (1947–2020), Mexican politician

Sciences

 Alberto Martinez Piedra, professor
 German Martinez Hidalgo, physicist, mathematician and astronomer
 Kirk Martinez professor, image processing
 Lissa Martinez, American ocean engineer
 Ronaldo Martínez, cancer survivor appearing in anti-smoking television commercials
 Rosa Martínez and Eliana Martínez, child with AIDS (Eliana) and her mother (Rosa)
 Wendy L. Martinez, American statistician

Society

 Mario Díaz Martínez, member of the World Scout Committee

Sports
A–M

 Adrian Martinez (American football) (born 2000), American quarterback
 Adrián Martínez (baseball) (born 1996), Mexican baseball player
 Alberto Martín Acosta Martinez (born 1977), Uruguayan football player
 Alec Martinez Los Angeles Kings Hockey player
 Alma Martínez (footballer), Mexican football player
 Andrés Martínez (footballer), Uruguayan football player
 Armando Martínez (boxer), Cuban boxer
 Blake Martinez (born 1994), American football player
 Carlos Martínez, Venezuelan baseball player
 Carmelo Martínez, Puerto Rican baseball player, first base and outfield
 Chantal Martínez (born 1990), Panamanian boxer
 Cristhian Martínez, baseball player from the Dominican Republic
 Conchita Martínez (born 1972), Spanish tennis player
 Conchita Martínez Granados (born 1976), Spanish tennis player
 Dave Martinez (born 1964), American baseball player and coach
 David Martínez (racing driver), Mexican racing driver
 Dennis Martínez, Nicaraguan baseball pitcher
 Diego Martínez (Mexican footballer, born 1981)
 Edgar Martínez, Puerto Rican American baseball player, hitter
 Emil Martínez, Honduran footballer
 Emiliano Martínez, Argentine footballer
 Emilio Martínez (footballer, born 1981), Paraguayan footballer
 Eulogio Martínez, footballer
 Félix Martínez Mata, baseball player 
 Fernando Martínez Perales, Spanish footballer
 Fidel Martínez, Ecuadorian footballer
 Francisca Martínez, Mexican race walker
 Gérald Martinez, French rugby player
 Germán Martínez (swimmer), Colombian swimmer
 Gilberto Martínez, Costa Rican footballer
 Gilberto Érick Martínez, Mexican footballer
 Glenn Martinez, American wide receiver
 Gonzalo Martínez, Colombian footballer
 Guillermo Martínez (athlete), Cuban javelin thrower
 Héctor Vidal Martínez (born 1967), Paraguayan football midfielder
 Henry Martínez (boxer), bantamweight boxer of El Salvador
 Iñigo Martínez, Spanish footballer
 Israel Martínez, Mexican footballer
 Jack Michael Martínez, Dominican basketball player
 Jackson Martínez, Colombian footballer
 Jairo Martínez, Honduran football forward
 Javi Martínez (born 1988), Spanish footballer
 Javier Martínez (baseball) (born 1977), baseball player
 Javier Omar Martínez, Honduran footballer
 Javier Martínez González (born 1987), Spanish footballer
 J. D. Martinez (born 1987), American baseball player
 Jesús Martínez (boxer) (born 1976), Mexican boxer
 Jesus Martinez (fighter) (born 1983), American mixed martial artist
 Joe Martinez (baseball), American baseball player
 Jorge Andrés Martínez, Uruguayan footballer
 Jorge Humberto Martínez, Colombian cyclist
 José Martínez, Venezuelan baseball player
 Josef Martínez, Venezuelan footballer
 Josué Martínez, Costa Rican footballer
 Juan Manuel Martínez, Argentine footballer
 Juan Martínez Brito, Cuban discus thrower
 Juan Máximo Martínez, Mexican long-distance runner
 Julen Luis Arizmendi Martínez, Spanish chess grandmaster
 Julio Enrique Martínez, Salvadoran footballer
 Kathleen Martínez (born 1966), Dominican archaeologist, lawyer, and diplomat
 Lautaro Martínez, Argentine footballer
 Lázaro Martínez (sprinter), Cuban sprinter
 Lisandro Martínez, Argentine footballer
 Leandro Antonio Martínez, Argentine-Italian footballer
 Lucas Martínez (field hockey), Argentine field hockey player
 Luís Fernando Martinez, Brazilian footballer
 "Punishment" Luis Martinez, American wrestler better known as Damian Priest
 Magdelín Martínez, Cuban triple jumper
 Manuel Martínez Lara, Spanish footballer
 Maria Martinez, Native-American potter in the United States
 María José Martínez Sánchez (born 1982), Spanish tennis player
 Mariano Martínez (cyclist) (born 1948), French former professional road racing cyclist
 Mario Martínez (footballer, born 1989), Honduran footballer
 Mario Martinez (tennis), Bolivian tennis player
 Marty Martínez, sports manager, coach, and scout
 Mayte Martínez, Spanish runner
 Mercedes Martinez, American professional wrestler
 Michael Martínez, Major League Baseball player from the Dominican Republic
 Michael Christian Martinez, Filipino figure skater
 Miguel Ángel Martínez (Argentinian footballer), Argentine footballer

N–Z

 Nick Martinez (baseball) (born 1990), American baseball player
 Orlando Martínez, former Cuban bantamweight boxer
 Osvaldo Martínez, Paraguayan footballer
 Pamela Martinez, American professional wrestler better known as Bayley
 Pedro Martínez (born 1971), Dominican baseball player
 Pedro Martínez (basketball), Spanish basketball coach
 Pedro Martínez (golfer) (born 1963), Paraguayan golfer
 Pedro Martínez (left-handed pitcher) (born 1968), Dominican baseball player
 Poppies Martinez (born 1981), American mixed martial artist
 Rafa Martínez, Spanish basketball player
 Ramón Martínez (infielder), American baseball player, infielder
 Ramón Martínez (pitcher), Dominican Republic baseball player, pitcher
 Roberto Martínez, Spanish football manager and former player
 Roberto Juan Martínez, Argentine footballer
 Rogelio Martínez (boxer) (born 1974), a Dominican Republic boxer
 Román Martínez (boxer), Puerto Rican professional boxer
 Rubén Iván Martínez, Spanish footballer
 Rubert Martínez (born 1985), Cuban judoka
 Ryan Martinez (born 1987), American mixed martial artist
 Saúl Martínez, Honduran footballer
 Sergio Martínez (boxer), Argentine boxer
 Sergio Daniel Martínez, Uruguayan footballer
 Seth Martinez (born 1994), American baseball player
 Shelly Martinez (born 1980), Mexican American professional wrestler (as Ariel) and valet (as Salinas). Also known as model, actress (using her name Shelly Martinez) 
 Ted Martínez, Dominican baseball player, shortstop
 Tippy Martinez, American retired baseball pitcher
 Tino Martinez, American baseball player, first base
 Tony Martínez, American baseball player
 Víctor Martínez (baseball), Venezuelan baseball player, catcher
 Víctor Martínez (bodybuilder), professional bodybuilder from the Dominican Republic
 Walter Martínez (footballer, born 1982), Honduran footballer
 Will Martinez (born 1980), American mixed martial artist
 Yamilé Martínez, Cuban basketball player
 Yudelkis Martínez, Cuban runner

See also: Disambiguation pages

 Adrián Martínez (disambiguation)
 Alberto Martínez (disambiguation)
 Andrés Martinez (disambiguation)
 Armando Martínez (disambiguation)
 Carlos Martínez (disambiguation)
 David Martínez (disambiguation)
 Javier Martínez (disambiguation)
 Jorge Martinez (disambiguation)
 José Martínez (disambiguation)
 Mariano Martínez (disambiguation)
 Michael Martínez (disambiguation)
 Pedro Martínez (disambiguation)
 Roberto Martinez (disambiguation)
 Sergio Martínez (disambiguation)

References

Spanish-language surnames
Patronymic surnames
Surnames from given names
Surnames of Honduran origin
Surnames of Salvadoran origin
Surnames of Guatemalan origin
Surnames of Colombian origin

Surnames of Uruguayan origin